A collect call in Canada and the United States, known as a reverse charge call in other parts of the English-speaking world, is a telephone call in which the calling party wants to place a call at the called party's expense. In the past, collect calls were only possible as an operator-assisted call, but with the introduction of computer-based telephone dialing equipment, it is now possible to place a collect call without using an operator, which is called automated operator services (AOS) as opposed to Home Country Direct (HCD). (Automated reverse charge dialing eliminates a service that could be provided, at a higher fee, only on operator-assisted connections: the person-to-person call, in which there is no charge unless a designated person is available.)

In the US, while Mother's Day is the holiday with the highest number of phone calls, the day with the most collect calls is Father's Day.

Services

Australia
Several companies previously provided reverse call services in Australia, including 1800MUMDAD - 1800686323, 1800Reverse and 1800PhoneHome. In 2019, major telecommunication providers Optus and Telstra ceased billing services on behalf of third party content providers, causing these services to close. 12550 is an alternative Reverse charge call service available from Telstra Pay Telephones and Telstra Prepaid mobiles. However, in the case of prepaid phones, it is accessible only where there is sufficient credit to call 12550.

Telstra ran a reverse charge service called HomeLink during the 1990s and 2000s. Homelink consisted of an 1800 number and PIN that could only be linked to the user's home phone service. Calls were billed at a slightly higher cost than a standard local call. HomeLink grew out of popularity with the rise in mobile phones.

Brazil 
In Brazil, reverse calls are available for every land or mobile line call. All local reverse calls must be started by dialing 9090 and the desired phone number. If the user is not in the same zone as the recipient the calls must be started by dialing 90 + carrier code + area code + the desired phone number.

India 

There is not a simple way to make a reverse charge call for free in India. In early 2019 a private tech company launched services to enable a person to make an overseas reverse charge call. AT&T also provides a number to make collect calls from India to the United States. The number is 000–117.

Pakistan
A collect call can be made through any mobile in Pakistan by dialing a prefix of 11 before entering in the desired number.

Republic of Ireland
A collect call service operates under 800 Reverse (operated by Reverse Corp Ltd), in the Republic of Ireland. It offers reverse charge calls from any fixed line phone, pay phone and most mobile phones (even if the prepaid credit has run out), to most fixed land line and mobile phones in the Republic of Ireland. The company charges €2.99 to connect the call, including the first 60 seconds of the call, and €0.593 for every subsequent minute.

Eircom offered national and international reverse charge calling services until 24 February 2009. Prior to the cessation of services, national reverse charge service could be obtained by dialing the operator on 10 or, from payphones via 1 800 28 28 28 and international reverse charge services could be reached via the international operator on 114 or 1800 457 457 from payphones.

United Kingdom
In the UK, a number of services offer reverse charge calling. A caller can dial the international operator on 155 and ask for a reverse charge call, or alternatively dial an automated service such as  08000MUMDAD, 08000686323, or 0800REVERSE. Reverse charge calls can be made for free on some mobile networks, although the person being contacted via this service may be charged a considerable amount for accepting such a call.

United States and Canada
AT&T no longer operates a collect call service for the United States. Competitors include 1-800-COLLECT, which does serve VoIP receivers.

Verizon terminated the ability to receive collect calls on its landlines in 2016.

Prior to the introduction of the toll-free 800 area code in 1967, Zenith numbers in the U.S. and Canada, and Enterprise numbers in the U.S. only, indicated to an operator that the business agreed to automatically accept collect calls to that number. In the United Kingdom, Freefone numbers provided this service.

Kenya
The reverse call service has been available in Kenya for a long time, and was issued by the landline operator telkom A customer who needed the service had to call customer care and then request for reverse call. If The other person accepted, the call would then be connected and charged on his or her bill.
In June 2019, the largest mobile service provider Safaricom started rolling out reverse call services to all its customers. To access the service, A Customer has to dial # before the number being called for example if you want to call 123456, a customer would dial #123456. The caller details would appear on the screen as usual but when the person being called receives the call, he or she gets a voice response informing him or her that the call is a reverse call, if the customer wants to pay for the call, he will then press 1 on the keypad and the call is then connected and charged on his bill. Safaricom said that the cost of reverse calls is the same as the cost of normal calls.

References

Calling features